Marek Sobola (born 3 July 1981) is an authorised landscape architect, professional gardener  and heraldic artist from Slovakia.

Biography 
Sobola was born in Žilina, Czechoslovakia (now Slovakia) into a family from Lalinok and Divina. He spent the first years of his life in Divina. Sobola studied landscape architecture at the Slovak University of Agriculture in Nitra (SUA) at the Horticulture and Landscape Engineering Faculty. He graduated in 2004 and began working in own studio. Alongside the architect's practice he continued doctoral studies at SUA at the Faculty of European Studies and Regional Development, the Department of Sustainable Development in 2004 – 2007. After finishing his Ph.D. study he again continued his studies at the Constantine the Philosopher University in Nitra at the Faculty of Arts as an historian for another five years. He works as a heraldic artist since 2015. His specialization is the Ecclesiastical heraldry in Missionary countries. Sobola has since 2011 been a member of the Slovak Chamber of Architects. Between 2018 and 2019 he was a visiting member of the Czech Chamber of Architects. From 2017 is a member of the Liturgical Commission of the Roman Catholic Diocese of Žilina.

In 2018 three projects represented Slovakia at the international landscape exhibition entitled “Landscape Architecture as a common ground”. One of them was the author's work of Marek Sobola called Green wall Gothal in Liptovská Osada. The exhibition was organized by the European branch of the International Federation of Landscape Architects (IFLA).

He is also a member of the Scientific Board of the Kysuce Museum in Čadca and a member of the Council of the Episcopal Conference of Slovakia for Science, Education and Culture. Since 2020 is a member of the Heraldry Society of New Zealand and the Orders & Medals Research Society.

Selected works

Landscape architecture and architecture 
 Private gardens in Slovakia and Austria (Vienna)
 Monument of Divina Meteorite – Monument (corten steel)
Vertical gardens: Gothal Liptovská Osada, Mirage Shopping Centre in Žilina, Thalmeiner Café in Trnava, Vertical garden in Château Gbeľany
Roof Gardens: Eurovea Shopping Centre in Bratislava – intensive garden, SPA Rajecké Teplice – extensive garden
Green roof: Lietava Castle (Slovak: Lietavský hrad) – extensive castle ruin in the Súľov Mountains of northern Slovakia
 Mirage Shopping Centre Žilina, A composition in the old town (corten steel)
 Chapel of Saint Lazarus in Nová Bystrica: the reconstruction and renovation is an exact replica. The Chapel was blessed by Cardinal Dominik Duka O.P., the 36th Archbishop of Prague, Primate of Bohemia
 Carl Gustav Swensson Memorial and Carl Gustav Swensson Park in Žilina, Slovakia

Postal design 
 Postmark (official postal product) for the Slovak Post
Postage stamp with a personalized coupon: St. John of Nepomuk in Divina, author of postage stamp: Adrian Ferda
 Prepaid envelope with imprint: St. John of Nepomuk in Divina, issue number: 121 COB 106/17

Medals 
 Memorial medals for Roman Catholic Diocese of Rožňava, Slovakia
Silver Cross of the Roman Catholic Diocese of Žilina
Tree of Peace Memorial Plaque and Memorial Medal of Tree of Peace
Medal of Merit for Slovak Diplomacy, the highest award of the Ministry of Foreign Affairs of Slovakia

Ecclesiastical heraldry

Institutions – coats of arms/flags/seals 
 Metropolitan Roman Catholic Archdiocese of Rabaul, Papua New Guinea (PNG)
 Roman Catholic Archdiocese of Madang, PNG
 Roman Catholic Diocese of Alotau-Sideia, PNG
 Roman Catholic Diocese of Goroka, PNG
 Roman Catholic Diocese of Kimbe, PNG
 Roman Catholic Diocese of Bereina, PNG
 Roman Catholic Diocese of Samoa–Pago Pago (American Samoa)
 Roman Catholic Diocese of Reykjavík (Iceland) 
 Apostolic Vicariate of Northern Arabia based in Bahrain
 Diocese of Tonga (Kingdom of Tonga)
 Apostolic Prefecture of Azerbaijan (Azerbaijan)
 Mission "Sui Iuris" of Afghanistan

Persons 
 Archbishop Francesco Panfilo, S.D.B.
 Archbishop Karl Hesse MSC, MBE
 Archbishop Stephen Joseph Reichert, OFM Cap.
Archbishop Rochus Josef Tatamai
 Bishop William Fey, OFM Cap.
 Bishop Dariusz Kałuża MSF
 Bishop Dávid Bartimej Tencer, OFM Cap
 Bishop Vladimír Fekete, SDB.

The statue St. John of Nepomuk in Divina 
The project of restoration The statue St. John of Nepomuk in Divina was carried out under auspices of the Embassy of the Federal Republic of Germany in Slovakia. St. John of Nepomuk is one of the most frequently illustrated saints in the territory of the former Habsburg monarchy and there are monuments (mostly statues) of him in almost every village in Slovakia and Czechia. The, until now, unknown story of the statue of St. John of Nepomuk in Divina goes back to canonical visitation of the Divina parish on 1 September 1828, which provides the first reference of the time of origin of the statue – 1796. As referred to by the canonical visitation, the statue was damaged by a massive flood in 1822. Partners, who were addressed by Marek Sobola, the author of the project, to cooperate have either some connection to St. John of Nepomuk or to Slovakia. The project was honoured by patronage of His Majesty Norodom Sihamoni, the King of Cambodia and His Majesty Simeon II., the last Tsar of Bulgaria. Along with the Roman Catholic Diocese of Žilina, the project donors are: His Royal Highness Franz, Duke of Bavaria, The Equestrian Order of the Holy Sepulchre of Jerusalem (Ordo Equestris Sancti Sepulcri Hierosolymitani), The Knights of the Cross with the Red Star, the only Catholic knight order or Czech origin (Ordo militaris Crucigerorum cum rubea stella in pede pontis Pragensis), Metropolitan Chapter House of St. Vitus in Prague, which is the owner of the saint's grave and the town Nepomuk – the birthplace of St. John of Nepomuk. Out of domestic partners, the project was supported by municipalities of Divina, Divinka–Lalinok, Svederník and the Philatelist Club 53-19 from Žilina. The ceremonial holy mass in the St. Andrew's Church in Divina was on Friday 2 June 2017. After the holy mass, the statue was uncovered on its new stand by Joachim Bleicker, the Ambassador of the Federal Republic of Germany in Slovakia together with Emil Molko, Mayor of Divina and author of the project. Subsequently, it was blessed by Mons. Tomáš Galis, Bishop of Žilina.

Carl Gustav Swensson Memorial 
Marek Sobola is the bearer of the idea and co-author of the largest memorial dedicated to Carl Gustav Swensson in the world and in Europe. CGS Memorial is located in the park of the same name in Žilina, Slovakia. At the initiative of the NGO Servare et Manere, the town of Žilina decided to finance the CGS Memorial, which the NGO also built. The Memorial is located in a park with the same name and its authors are landscape architect and artist Marek Sobola and sculptor Michal Janiga. Ján Janík provided overall technical documentation and design of information panels located in the park. The Memorial project was carried out under the official auspices of the Embassy of the Kingdom of Sweden in Vienna.

Publications 
 SOBOLA, Marek (ed.): Divinka Lalinok. Divinka : Municipal office of Divinka 2018. .
SOBOLA, Marek (ed.): Príbeh svätojánsky, Socha sv. Jána Nepomuckého v Divine / The Story of St. John, Statue of St. John of Nepomuk in Divina / ដំណើររឿងរបស់ St. John, រូបចម្លាក់ St. John Nepomuk នៅក្រុង Divina / Die Johannisgeschichte, Die Staute des hl. Johannes Nepomuk in Divina / Историята на св. Ян, Статуята на св. Ян Непомуцки в Дивина. Žilina : Servare et Manere, o. z. a Kysucké múzeum v Čadci, 2017. .
 SOBOLA, Marek: Marek Sobola PORTFOLIO. Žilina : Marek Sobola 2016. .
 SOBOLA, Marek: Ľudová architektúra v Javorníkoch. In: KOLEKTÍV AUTOROV: JAVORNÍKY, Veľká kniha o nemalom pohorí, monografia. Martin : Matica Slovenská 2016. .
 SOBOLA, Marek: Kaplnka sv. Lazára z Betánie v Novej Bystrici. [S.l.], Slovenská komenda vojenského a špitálskeho rádu sv. Lazára Jeruzalemského, 2015. .
 JANURA, Tomáš - ZVEDELOVÁ, Kristína - SOBOLA, Marek. Vidiecke šľachtické sídla v Turčianskej stolici. Spoločnosť Kolomana Sokola s finančnou podporou Ministerstva kultúry SR a Historického ústavu SAV, 2014. Projekt HÚ SAC CE Hrady na Slovensku. Interdisciplinárny prierezový pohľad na fenomén hradov. .
 SOBOLA, Marek – BIELEK, Pavol: Prioritné a deficitné poľnohospodárske oblasti v katastrálnom území obce Oponice určené pedologickými charakteristikami (Preferred and deficit agricultural areas in cadastral area of Oponice village defined by pedological characteristics). In: Vedecké práce Výskumného ústavu pôdoznalectva a ochrany pôdy. Bratislava: Výskumný ústav pôdoznalectva a ochrany pôdy 2007, p. 138 – 151. .

Honours and awards

National awards 
Ministry of Culture of the Slovak Republic

 National competition Phoenix – National Cultural Monument of the year 2017 (Honorable recognition for exceptional realization of the restoration project of the Statue of St. John of Nepomuk in the village of Divina, located in the Žilina Region).
Association for Garden Design and Landscaping of Slovakia
 National competition Garden, Park, Garden detail of 2016, Category „Garden detail of 2016“ (III. place: Green wall in Château Gbeľany – Slovakia, II. place: Green wall in Gothal Liptovská Osada – Slovakia).

Foreign honours

Dynastic 
Romanian royal family

  Royal Medal for Loyalty (Medalia Regală pentru Loialitate), medal granted by Margareta, Custodian of the Crown of Romania (2022).

House of Bourbon-Two Sicilies
  Bronze Benemerenti Medal of the Franco-Neapolitan-Two Sicilian Sacred Military Constantinian Order of Saint George, medal granted by Prince Carlo, Duke of Castro (2021). 
House of Romanov
  Imperial Commemorative Medal “In Memory of the 100th Anniversary of the Great War, 1914-1918”, medal granted by Grand Duchess Maria Vladimirovna of Russia (2020).

Gallery

References

External links 

Marek Sobola: Official website

Living people
Slovak landscape architects
Landscape or garden designers
Ecclesiastical heraldry
Heraldic artists
Catholic heraldry
1981 births
People from Žilina
Biography/Arts and entertainment articles needing expert attention